Summer Lynn Lee (born November 26, 1987) is an American politician and community organizer serving as the U.S. representative for Pennsylvania's 12th congressional district since 2023. A member of the Democratic Party, Lee served as a member of the Pennsylvania House of Representatives for the 34th district from 2019 to 2022. With the support of the local chapter of the Democratic Socialists of America, she defeated incumbent Paul Costa in the 2018 Democratic primary election with over 67% of the vote. Lee was the first black woman to represent Southwestern Pennsylvania in the state legislature.

Lee was the Democratic nominee in the 2022 election to represent Pennsylvania's 12th congressional district in the United States House of Representatives. She won the primary by less than 1% of the vote over her closest opponent, Steve Irwin, the chair of the State Advisory Committee for the United States Commission on Civil Rights. She won the general election, and became the first Black woman from Pennsylvania in the House of Representatives.

Lee was a member of Democratic Socialists of America, but left DSA before winning office after disagreements with the Pittsburgh DSA chapter.

Early life and education
Of African American heritage, Lee was raised in North Braddock, Pennsylvania, and attended Woodland Hills High School. She graduated from Pennsylvania State University in 2009 and earned a Juris Doctor from the Howard University School of Law in 2015. She campaigned for Bernie Sanders in the 2016 Democratic primaries after graduating.

Pennsylvania House of Representatives 

Lee challenged incumbent Representative Paul Costa in the Democratic primary for the 34th district in 2018. An organizer from Pittsburgh's DSA chapter approached her about running after she led a successful write-in campaign for a school board candidate. She defeated Costa, 67.8% to 32.2%, attributing her victory to grassroots campaigning. She was unopposed in the general election.

Committee assignments 

 Education
 Health
 Judiciary

U.S. House of Representatives

Tenure

Syria 
In 2023, Lee was among 56 Democrats to vote in favor of H.Con.Res. 21, which directed President Joe Biden to remove U.S. troops from Syria within 180 days.

2022 election 

In October 2021, Lee announced her candidacy for Pennsylvania's 18th congressional district after the incumbent representative, Mike Doyle, announced his retirement. After Pennsylvania's new congressional districts were chosen in February 2022, most of the old 18th district, including Pittsburgh as well as parts of the Mon Valley and Westmoreland County, became the 12th district, and Lee announced she would run there.

Lee won the Democratic primary election on May 17, 2022, defeating rival Steve Irwin. Though Irwin had an early lead on election night with early and mail-in ballots, Lee emerged with a victory of around 740 votes once in-person Election Day votes were counted. She won the Allegheny County portion of the district by almost 4,500 votes. Most networks had declared Lee the winner by May 20, and Irwin conceded that day.

In the November 8 general election, Lee defeated Republican Mike Doyle (no relation to the Democratic incumbent).

Lee simultaneously ran for reelection to the Pennsylvania House of Representatives; she was reelected to a third term with little opposition, but was required to resign the seat to assume her new role in the U.S. House, which she did on December 7, 2022. With elections in the 32nd district, where incumbent Tony DeLuca died in October 2022 but was reelected posthumously to a 21st term, and the 35th district, where incumbent Austin Davis was simultaneously reelected to a third full term and elected lieutenant governor of Pennsylvania, an unusual situation arose in which the Democratic Party gained control of the chamber, having won 102 seats to the Republican Party's 101 in the 2022 elections, but would begin the new legislative term with just 99 members, due to these three vacancies in solidly Democratic districts in Allegheny County.

Caucus memberships 

 Congressional Black Caucus
 Congressional Progressive Caucus

Committee assignments 

 Committee on Science and Technology
 Committee on Oversight and Accountability

Electoral history

2018

2020

2022

Personal life
Lee lives in Swissvale, Pennsylvania.

See also
List of African-American United States representatives
List of Democratic Socialists of America who have held office in the United States
Women in the United States House of Representatives

Notes

References

External links

 Congresswoman Summer Lee official U.S. House website
Summer Lee for Congress campaign website
Representative Summer Lee official legislative website 

|-

|-

1987 births
20th-century African-American people
20th-century African-American women
21st-century African-American politicians
21st-century African-American women
21st-century American politicians
21st-century American women politicians
African-American members of the United States House of Representatives
African-American state legislators in Pennsylvania
African-American women in politics
Democratic Party members of the Pennsylvania House of Representatives
Democratic Party members of the United States House of Representatives from Pennsylvania
Democratic Socialists of America politicians from Pennsylvania
Female members of the United States House of Representatives
Howard University School of Law alumni
Lawyers from Pittsburgh
Living people
People from North Braddock, Pennsylvania
Politicians from Pittsburgh
Women state legislators in Pennsylvania